Syneta carinata is a species of leaf beetle.
It is found in northwestern North America. The specific name was first used by Johann Friedrich von Eschscholtz in his collection before 1831, but was never published by him. Instead, the name is attributed to Carl Gustaf Mannerheim, who published a description of the species in 1843.

References

Further reading
 Arnett, R.H. Jr., M. C. Thomas, P. E. Skelley and J. H. Frank. (eds.). (2002). American Beetles, Volume II: Polyphaga: Scarabaeoidea through Curculionoidea. CRC Press LLC, Boca Raton, FL.
 Arnett, Ross H. (2000). American Insects: A Handbook of the Insects of America North of Mexico. CRC Press.
 Richard E. White. (1983). Peterson Field Guides: Beetles. Houghton Mifflin Company.
 Riley, Edward G., Shawn M. Clark, and Terry N. Seeno (2003). "Catalog of the leaf beetles of America north of Mexico (Coleoptera: Megalopodidae, Orsodacnidae and Chrysomelidae, excluding Bruchinae)". Coleopterists Society Special Publication no. 1, 290.

External links
NCBI Taxonomy Browser, Syneta carinata

Synetinae
Beetles described in 1843
Taxa named by Carl Gustaf Mannerheim (naturalist)